Alfred Lawrie (1882-1942) was a Scottish rugby union player and international referee. He became the 57th President of the Scottish Rugby Union.

Rugby Union career

Amateur career

He was educated at Fettes College and Oxford University. At Oxford's Trinity College he played for the rugby union team Oxford University, receiving his first 'blue' on 1903.

On his return to Scotland, Lawrie played for Edinburgh Wanderers.

Referee career

He refereed the Scotland Probables versus Scotland Possibles match in December 1923.

He became an international referee. He refereed the Ireland versus France match in the Five Nations Championship of 1926.

Lawrie refereed in the 1926 Melrose Sevens.

Administrative career

He was a committee member of the SRU before becoming President.

He was the 57th President of the Scottish Rugby Union, in post from 1936 to 1938.

His time as President was notable as he gave comprehensive statements to the Press after General Meetings of the SRU. This was reported as a 'revolutionary break with tradition' for the SRU.

Cricket career

He played cricket both for Fettes College and Trinity College in Oxford.

Stockbroking and business career

He was a senior partner in the firm Lawrie & Ker of Edinburgh. In 1925, he became a member of the Edinburgh Stock Exchange Committee; in 1931 he was elected its chairman.

He held many directorships of various companies:- the first, second and third Edinburgh Investment Trusts; Murrayfield Ice Rink and Sports Stadium; Oregon Mortgage Company; Realisation and Debenture Corporation of Scotland; the Scottish Insurance Corporation; and the Scottish Reversionary Company.

He was Chairman of Rest Hotels; and the St. Andrews Trust.

He was a Vice-President of the Edinburgh Chamber of Commerce until 10 days before his death, when he retired due to ill-health.

Other interests

He wrote a register of Fettes College in 1923; 'The Fettes College Register 1870-1922'. He was a Governor of the Fettes Trust. He refereed the College Sports Day in 1922.

During the Second World War he joined the Special Constabulary. He also did philanthropic work with the Church of Scotland for the Hut and Canteen work for H.M. armed forces; and was an elder of St. Giles Cathedral in Edinburgh.

He was a Chairman of the West Edinburgh Unionist Association.

He was also a Justice of the Peace for Edinburgh City Council.

Death

Lawrie died on 2 May 1942 at his home in North Berwick. He was cremated on 5 May 1942.

He died in the same weekend as Patrick Munro. Munro had a similar career to Lawrie: both went to Oxford University and played for the Oxford University rugby union side, both breaking through in 1903; both became Presidents of the Scottish Rugby Union; and both were prominent Unionists.

References

1882 births
1942 deaths
Scottish rugby union players
Presidents of the Scottish Rugby Union
Edinburgh Wanderers RFC players
Oxford University RFC players
Scottish Districts referees
Scottish rugby union referees
Rugby union players from Edinburgh